Cornelis van Nijenrode, also Cornelis van Nieuwroode (born Naarden; died Hirado, 31 January 1633), was Governor of the VOC-trading post in Hirado, Japan from 1623 to 1633.

Cornelis arrived in Asia in 1607. He filled several posts at Dutch East India Company-trading post in Siam. In 1622 he took part in an expedition, sent from Formosa, to the coast of China.

In Japan Cornelis had a daughter, Cornelia, with a Japanese woman named Surishia.

Cornelis died in 1633, just before he was about to leave for Batavia.

1633 deaths
Dutch chiefs of factory in Japan
People from Naarden
17th-century Dutch colonial governors
Year of birth unknown